Vijaya lakshmi is a Hindu Indian feminine given name or surname, which means "goddess of victory". The name may refer to:

People

First name
Vijayalakshmi Atluri, Indian computer scientist
Vijayalakshmi (Kannada actress), Indian actress
Vijayalakshmi (poet) (born 1960), Indian poet
Vijayalakshmi Feroz (born 1982), Indian actress
Vijayalakshmy K. Gupta (born 1951), Indian civil servant
Vijayalakshmi Navaneethakrishnan (born 1946), Indian musician
Vijayalakshmi Ramanan, Surgeon and Indian Air Force officer
Vijayalakshmi Ravindranath (born 1953), Indian neuroscientist
Vijayalakshmy Subramaniam, Indian musician
Vijaya Lakshmi Pandit, Indian diplomat and politician

Surname
B. R. Vijayalakshmi, Indian cinematographer
L. Vijayalakshmi, Indian actress
Lalgudi Vijayalakshmi (born 1963), Indian musician
Potturi Vijayalakshmi (born 1953), Indian writer
Subbaraman Vijayalakshmi (born 1979), Indian chess player 
Vaikom Vijayalakshmi (born 1981), Indian singer

See also
Vijaya
Lakshmi

Hindu given names
Indian feminine given names